is a Japanese television drama which ran weekly for three months in 2003. The drama, which stars Kazunari Ninomiya of Arashi and Tomohisa Yamashita of NEWS, centers on the lives of the last four virgins left in their highschool as they struggle to lose their virginity over their final high school summer vacation. A 6-DVD box set featuring all eleven episodes, as well as six individual volumes, were released in Japan on December 18, 2003.

Plot

Four schoolboys find themselves the last virgins left at school. During the summer holidays, a girl they knew as children 11 years ago, moves back to the neighborhood. Despite their childhood attraction to her, they realize she is a mere shadow of the "princess" they all thought they knew. This story of summer—love, friendship, school, family, the hypocrisy of adults, complications of life, experience and failure—is set in an everyday shopping district and shows the clumsiness of children who have developed a little later than their peers.

Setting

The story takes place in the Shinagawa ward of Tokyo, although at least one location, namely the school, is actually in Yokohama.

Main characters

Shōhei Asai (Shō-chan)
, nicknamed Shō-chan, is the main protagonist of the story, and often his thoughts are expressed by narration. He lives with his older sister Yuriko and his parents, who run a drugstore. At the start of the series, he is head over heels in love with one of his temporary teachers, the young Isuzu Mochizuki. His life starts to go crazy when an old childhood friend, Chie Ōwada, decides to visit the four long-time friends and moves into his house.

Kengo Iwasaki (Kenken)
 is a train freak, knowing the schedule of all trains passing through the suburb by heart. He lives with his single mother, Kimiko, who runs a love hotel which she bought with the divorce money. The four boys often hang around there, playing karaoke or listening to other paying customers in neighboring rooms. Kenken is the only one of the group who, at the beginning of the series, has a girlfriend: Sonoko Fujisawa.

Hayato Udagawa (Udayan)
 is a member of the high school band. He is the one the girls (especially the group of four he calls the Amazones) pick on most, to which is added that his self-confidence is a little lacking, and that he has a certain affection for peeping under girl's skirts. His parents run a grocery store in the shopping district.

Kōji Enami (Kō-kun)
 is the sports ace of the group. He's on the school soccer team and is known for often letting out his anger that way. When talking to girls he often starts to mumble incomprehensibly, turning down all offers from them. His father, who is also the chairman of the local neighbourhood meetings, runs a small shop.

Chie Ōwada (Chie-chan)
 is the "childhood princess" the 4 friends knew 11 years ago, up until she had to move away with her parents. There was very little contact between her and the boys during the time span, and she seems to hide a dark secret within her. It is later revealed that during her high school year, she had a crush on one of her classmates, but he took advantage of the situation, raped her and threatened to blackmail her. To escape this awkward situation, and the rumors that soon started to spread, she set out on her journey to Togoshi, to meet her old childhood friends.

Minor characters

 – Yumiko Shaku
 – Koji Matoba
 – Takako Kato
 – Rio Matsumoto
 – Takashi Tsukamoto
 – Becky

Staff
Screenplay - Arisa Kaneko
Producer - Akihito Ishimaru
Director - Yukihiko Tsutsumi, Arata Katō, et al.
Planning - Hiroki Ueda
Music - Audio Highs
Theme Song -  by Arashi

Production
Line Producer - Ichiyama Ryūji
Assistant Producer - Ogishima Tatsuya, Motoyoshi Masaru, Sugimura Kei
Assistant Director - Hirakawa Yūichiro, Nando Masaaki, Takahashi Masanao, Shiozaki Jun, Suzuki Masaaki
Executive Producer - Nakagawa Shingo
Chief Producer - Mikami Shin'ichi, 清藤唯靖
Advanced Production - Uematsu Ikumi, Inui Yoshihiro
Production Record - Okudaira Ayako, Tanaka Kosuzu
Program Desk - Ozawa Michiko
Organization - Tsuru Masaaki

Episode list

Notes

Tomohisa Yamashita, who plays Kengo (Kenken), is a Japanese idol. He is a former member and leader of the popular J-pop group NEWS. 
Kazunari Ninomiya, who plays Shōhei, is a member of the Japanese boy band Arashi, which performed the title song for the series.
The first episode starts with a fast zoom-in from space to the rooftop of the school in Shinagawa-ku. However, if one compares the scene to a real satellite view of the same area (using, for example, Google Earth), it is clear that, although there actually is a school at exactly that location, it's not the one we see in the opening.
Hiroki Narimiya, who plays Hayato, and Shun Oguri, who plays Kōji, have both acted with Jun Matsumoto, another member of Arashi, in other famous Japanese dramas; Hiroki Narimiya in Gokusen and Shun Oguri in Gokusen, Hana yori Dango, Hana yori Dango Returns and Smile.
Stand Up!! has a similar premise to the film American Pie, with four young men struggling to lose their virginity in their final year of high school.

References

External links
  (in Japanese)
  in the TBS Program Catalog (in English)
 

2000s sex comedy television series
2003 Japanese television series debuts
2003 Japanese television series endings
Japanese comedy television series
Kin'yō Dorama